Sunny Hinduja (born 25 November 1985) is an Indian actor. He is known for his work in the Hindi film and television industry. In 2021, He gained popularity among by playing an important character of Sandeep Bhaiya in TVF web series Aspirants. He has also worked in TV series The Family Man (2019), Chacha Vidhayak Hain Humare Season 2 (2021), and Jamun (2021).

Early life and education 

Sunny Hinduja was born in Indore, Madhya Pradesh. His father’s name is Satram das Hinduja. He completed studies from Daly College of Indore, Madhya Pradesh and Birla Institute of Technology and Science, Pilani. Sunny received his actor training at the Film and Television Institute of India (FTII), Pune.

Career 

Sunny debuted with the film Shaapit: The Cursed in the year 2010. He also served as a theater artist at FTII and played several long and short plays. Sunny also starred in the movie Ballad of Rustom, in which he performed the lead role in Rustum. In 2012, Sunny was part of an international project led by 25 filmmakers worldwide, The Owner. He has appeared in several television ads such as Sprite, Continental Coffee, etc.

Filmography

Films

Web-series

TV series

References

External links

1990 births
Living people
21st-century Indian male actors
Male actors in Hindi cinema
Indian male film actors